Oligonicella is a wide-ranging genus of mantises in the family Thespidae. It is represented in Africa, Asia, Europe, and North America.

Species
Species in the genus include:
O. bolliana
O. brunneri — Europe.
O. punctulata
O. scudderi — North America.
O. striolata
O. tessellata

See also
List of mantis genera and species

References

Thespidae
Mantodea of Africa
Mantodea of Asia
Mantodea of Europe
Mantodea of North America
Mantodea genera